Over the Hill to the Poorhouse, also known as Over the Hill, is a 1920 American silent drama film about a woman who has a lot of children, and who never gets the chance to enjoy life. The film starred actress Mary Carr and almost all of her real-life children.

The film was directed by Harry Millarde, released by Fox Film Corporation, and was a box office success in 1920.

The story was previously filmed as Over the Hill to the Poorhouse (1908), starring Florence Auer. It was remade as Over the Hill (1931), starring Mae Marsh, and as Tears of a Mother (1937). The 1920 silent film is preserved at Bois d'Arcy in France.

The film cost $50,00 to make with an additional $200,000 in marketing.

Cast
Mary Carr as Ma Benton
James Sheridan as Child Isaac (billed as Sheridan Tansey)
Noel Tearle as Adult Isaac
Stephen Carr as Child Thomas
William Welsh as Pa Benton
Jerry Devine as Child John
Johnnie Walker as Adult John (billed as John Walker)
James Sheldon as Child Charles
Wallace Ray as Adult Charles
Rosemary Carr as Child Rebecca
Phyllis Diller as Adult Rebecca (this Phyllis Diller is not the TV comedian)
Maybeth Carr as Child Susan
Louella Carr as Adult Susan
Vivienne Osborne as Isabella Strong
Dorothy Allen as Agulitia
Edna Murphy as Lucy
Joseph Donohoe as Undetermined role
John T. Dwyer as Adult Thomas

See also
List of Fox Film films

References

External links

Cinematographer Hal Sintzenich and director Harry Millarde (holding megaphone) with cast and crew
Lobby poster for the film (courtesy Zoverhill)

1920 films
American silent feature films
Films based on poems
Fox Film films
1920 drama films
Silent American drama films
American black-and-white films
Films directed by Harry F. Millarde
1920s American films